The Luzon giant forest mouse (Apomys magnus) is a forest mouse endemic to Luzon, Philippines.

References

Apomys
Rodents of the Philippines
Mammals described in 2011
Endemic fauna of the Philippines